Goniophthalmus is a genus of flies in the family Tachinidae.

Species
G. australis Baranov, 1938
G. frontoides Chao & Zhou, 1987
G. halli Mesnil, 1956
G. simonyi Villeneuve, 1910

References

Exoristinae
Diptera of Europe
Diptera of Asia
Diptera of Africa
Tachinidae genera
Taxa named by Joseph Villeneuve de Janti